Asian junior records in the sport of athletics are ratified by the Asian Athletics Association. Athletics records comprise the best performance of an athlete before the year of their 20th birthday. Technically, in all under 20 age divisions, the age is calculated "on December 31 of the year of competition" to avoid age group switching during a competitive season. The AAA maintains these records only in a specific list of outdoor events. All other records, including all indoor records, shown on this list are tracked by statisticians not officially sanctioned by the world governing body.

Outdoor

Key:

+ = en route to a longer distance

h = hand timing

Men

Women

Mixed

Indoor

Men

Women

Notes

References
General
Asian Records & Best Performances 30 July 2022 updated
Specific

junior
Asian